Wardell "Preacher" Jones (born c. 1905) was an American jazz trumpeter.

Jones played early in his career in New York City in the ballroom bands of Bill Brown and Benny Carter before joining Bingie Madison's ensemble. Jones joined the Mills Blue Rhythm Band, playing with the group from 1930 to 1936 and recording with them several times. In addition to trumpet, he occasionally played trombone with the group and did arranging work. Later in the 1930s he played with Fats Waller and Hot Lips Page, but appears to have left music after 1940.

References

American jazz trumpeters
American male trumpeters
American male jazz musicians
Mills Blue Rhythm Band members